Year 1393 (MCCCXCIII) was a common year starting on Wednesday (link will display full calendar) of the Julian calendar.

Events 
 January 28 – Bal des Ardents: Four members of the court of Charles VI of France die in a fire, at a masquerade ball.

 Date unknown 
 In central Persia, the Muzzafarid Empire, led by Shah Mansur, rebels against their Timurid occupiers. The rebellion is squashed and the Muzaffarid nobility are executed, ending the Muzaffarid dynasty in Persia.
 George VII succeeds his popular father, Bagrat V, as King of Georgia.
 Abdul Aziz II becomes Sultan of the Marinid dynasty in present-day Morocco, after the death of Sultan Abu Al-Abbas.
 Raimondo Del Balzo Orsini succeeds Otto, Duke of Brunswick-Grubenhagen, as Prince of Taranto (now southeastern Italy).
 Samsenethai succeeds his father, Fa Ngum, as King of Lan Xang (now Laos).
 King James I of Cyprus inherits the title of King of Armenia, after the death of his distant cousin Leo VI (although the Mamluk conquerors from Egypt remain the true rulers).
 A Ming dynasty Chinese record states that 720,000 sheets of toilet paper (two by three ft. in size) alone have been produced for the various members of the imperial court at Beijing, while the Imperial Bureau of Supplies also reports that 15,000 sheets of toilet paper alone have been designated for the royal family (made of fine soft yellow tissue and perfumed). 
 Bosnia resists an invasion by the Ottoman Empire.
 The Ottoman Turks capture Turnovgrad (now Veliko Tarnovo), the capital city of east Bulgaria. Emperor Ivan Shishman is allowed to remain as puppet ruler of east Bulgaria.
 Despite his treaty with the king of Poland, Roman I of Moldavia supports Fyodor Koriatovych against the king. Losing the battle, he will also lose the throne of Moldavia the next year.
 Sikander Shah I succeeds Muhammad Shah III, as Sultan of Delhi. Sikander Shah I is succeeded two months later by Mahmud II.
 Abu Thabid II succeeds Abu Tashufin II, as ruler of the Abdalwadid dynasty in present-day eastern Algeria. Abu Thabid is succeeded in the same year by his brother, Abul Hadjdjadj I.
 Konrad von Jungingen succeeds Konrad von Wallenrode, as Grand Master of the Teutonic Knights.
 Maelruanaidh MacDermot succeeds Aedh MacDermot, as King of Magh Luirg in north-central Ireland.
 King Stjepan Dabiša of Bosnia signs the Contract of Djakovice, establishing peace with King Sigismund of Hungary.
 Byzantium loses Thessaly to the growing Ottoman Empire.

Births 
 February 3 – Henry Percy, 2nd Earl of Northumberland (d. 1455)
 August 24 – Arthur III, Duke of Brittany (d. 1458)
 December – Margaret of Burgundy, Dauphine of France  (d. 1442)
 date unknown
 John Capgrave, English theologian (d. 1464)
 Giovanni Antonio Del Balzo Orsini, Prince of Taranto (d. 1463)
 Anna of Moscow, Byzantine empress consort  (d. 1417)
 Osbern Bokenam, English Augustinian friar and poet
 Thomas de Morley, 5th Baron Morley
 Andrea Vendramin, Doge of Venice (d. 1478)
 Alvise Loredan, Venetian admiral and statesman (d. 1466)

Deaths 
 March 7 – Bogislaw VI, Duke of Pomerania (b. c. 1350)
 June 6 – Emperor Go-En'yū of Japan, former Pretender to the throne (b. 1359)
 July 23 – Konrad von Wallenrode, Grand Master of the Teutonic Knights
 July 30 – Alberto d'Este, Lord of Ferrara and Modena (b. 1347)
 August 6 – John de Ros, 5th Baron de Ros (b. 1365)
 November 29 – King Leo V of Armenia (b. c. 1342)
 date unknown
 Fa Ngum, founder of the Lao Kingdom of Lan Xang (b. 1316)
 Valentina Visconti, Queen of Cyprus
 King Bagrat V of Georgia
 Abu'l-Abbas Ahmad al-Mustansir, Sultan of the Marinid dynasty in Morocco

References